
Hyder is a name, used as both a given name and surname. It may be an Urdu variant spelling of the Arabic name Haydar.

People with this name include:

Given name
Hyder Akbar (born 1984), American writer and entrepreneur in Afghanistan
Hyder Ali (1721–1782), sultan and de facto ruler of the Kingdom of Mysore in southern India
Hyder Ali (Indian cricketer) (born 1943)
Hyder Ali Leghari, (1934–2008), Pakistani writer and teacher
Hyder Bilgrami, Indian film director
Hyder Husyn (born 1963), Bangladeshi singer-songwriter
Hyder Bux Jatoi (1901–1970), revolutionary peasant leader in Sindh, Pakistan
Hyder Edward Rollins (1889–1958), American scholar
Hyder Shah (fl.1870), secret agent, member of the British Indian Army

Middle name
Ghulam Hyder Samejo, Pakistani politician, member of the National Assembly of Pakistan from 2002 to 2013 
Ghullam Hyder Mehjoor Solangi (born 1941), Sindhi historian
Shezada Hyder Ali, grandson of Hyder Ali

Surname
Adnan Hyder, Pakistan-born American academic
Bushra Hyder, Pakistani schoolteacher and peace activist
Gaylon Hyder (born1974), former American football player
Jamie Gray Hyder (born 1985), American actress
John Hyder (1912–2003), American college basketball coach
Joseph Hyder (died 1932), secretary to the Land Nationalisation Society, UK
Holly Hyder (born 1988), former Australian cricketer
Ken Hyder (born 1946),  Scottish jazz fusion drummer
Kerry Hyder (born 1991), American football player
Liz Hyder, English author
Lodhi Karim Hyder (1890–1953), Indian economist and politician
Martin Hyder (born 1961), English actor and writer
Pulikkottil Hyder (born 1879), Indian poet
Qurratulain Hyder (1927–2007), novelist

See also
Baba Hyder Vali of Mulbagal,12th-century Sufi saint
Hyder (disambiguation)